Burgundy & Blue is an album by Staggered Crossing, released in 2004. It was produced by Ed Zych and was the band's first recording on Bent Penny Records. "Perfect Prize" was released as a single and peaked at #17 on Canada's Rock chart.

Track listing 

"Burgundy & Blue
"Grow
"My Disease
"Trail of Broken Hearts
"Letters to a Young Girl
"Don't Get Me Started
"When The Rain's All Gone
"Under Circumstances Like These
"Perfect Prize
"Nuclear Winter (Next 2 You)
"In The Trees at Night
"Save Me Tonight

References 

2004 albums
Staggered Crossing albums